IFK Tumba FK is a Swedish football club located in Tumba.

Background
IFK Tumba FK currently plays in Division 4 Stockholm Södra which is the sixth tier of Swedish football. They play their home matches at the Storvretens BP in Tumba.

The club is affiliated to Stockholms Fotbollförbund.

Season to season

Footnotes

External links 
 Tumba FK - Official website

Football clubs in Stockholm
1932 establishments in Sweden
Fotboll
Tumba, Sweden